Ben Wu (born 1 January 1989), also known as Wu SzuShien, is a Taiwanese singer, actor and television host.

Career

2007–2013: Early beginnings 
In 2007, Ben Wu participated in the variety program,  (鑽石夜總會), as the dance club president of Taipei Municipal Jianguo High School.

On 22 February 2008, he became a fixed cast member of the variety show,  (模范棒棒堂). His last episode aired on 24 December 2008.

2013–2014: Army hiatus, debut as singer 
In May 2013, he enlisted into the army and was discharged in 2014.

After his discharge, Wu signed with music label  and debuted as a singer with the album, The Best...? in 2014.

2015–present: Debut as an actor, release of first EP "Hide and Seek" 
In 2015, Wu made his debut as an actor in the SETTV drama, Love Cuisine as one of the supporting male leads. Due to his role in the show, he was awarded with the Best Potential Award during the Sanlih Drama Awards in 2015. He was also nominated for Best Newcomer in A Television Series Award during the 51st Golden Bell Awards.

On 30 May 2016, he released his first EP "Hide and Seek". In the same year, Wu starred as the male lead in the web-drama I Like You, You Know?.

In 2017, Wu starred as the second male lead in the SETTV drama, The Perfect Match.

In 2018, he starred as the male lead in the SETTV drama, Iron Ladies, along with co-star Aviis Zhong. Two of his songs became the opening and closing OST for the show.

In addition, his upcoming drama, Love and 3.14159 is set to air on 22 July 2018.

Personal life 
Ben Wu is an alumnus of National Taiwan University of Arts as well as Tamkang University, where he studied acting. He has 2 elder sisters. His eldest sister, Si Ying Wu is a stewardess. His second sister, is also an artiste from the same label, A Legend Star Entertainment Corp. She was a model, a member of Sparrow Girls (M.A.N Girls), and has her own clothing brand, Ann Wu.

Filmography

Television

Variety shows

Films 
 Always Miss You (2014)

Discography

Studio albums

Extended plays

Awards and nominations

Music

Acting

References 

1991 births
Living people
Taiwanese male television actors
Taiwanese male dancers
Taiwanese Mandopop singers
Taiwanese idols
21st-century Taiwanese  male singers